Roshan Weerasinghe (born 20 August 1976) is a Sri Lankan former cricketer. He played in 23 first-class and 10 List A matches between 1998/99 and 2010/11. He made his Twenty20 debut on 17 August 2004, for Burgher Recreation Club in the 2004 SLC Twenty20 Tournament.

References

External links
 

1976 births
Living people
Sri Lankan cricketers
Bloomfield Cricket and Athletic Club cricketers
Burgher Recreation Club cricketers
Singha Sports Club cricketers
Place of birth missing (living people)